Janaka Priyantha Bandara (born 1 February 1968) is a Sri Lankan Politician and diplomat. He was the Governor of Sabaragamuwa. He was earlier the Sri Lanka's Ambassador to the UAE. He was a member of the Sri Lankan Parliament, from the national list representing the Sri Lanka Freedom Party.

References

1968 births
Living people
Sri Lankan Buddhists
Governors of Sabaragamuwa Province
Members of the 14th Parliament of Sri Lanka
Sinhalese politicians